George "Clarence" Seitz (December 12, 1894 – December 10, 1976) was an American World War I military veteran, who was murdered in the neighborhood of Jamaica in New York City on December 10, 1976. Police recovered his remains 43 years later, and arrested his alleged murderer in 2021.

Disappearance 
The victim was a World War I veteran who went by "Clarence". He was reported missing after leaving his house to get a haircut; at the time, Seitz was 81 years old.

Investigation 
There were no leads and the investigation was placed in the cold cases file, abandoned for decades. However, in early 2019, a woman in her 50s informed the police that as an 11-year-old girl, she had seen her mother's companion dismember and bury a body. The police used dogs to scour the property where she had lived at the time, and found human remains, but were unable to identify the victim. Only the pelvis and part of the torso were found.

Identification of victim 
Using material from the remains, investigators generated a genetic profile. Two years later, still unable to identify Steitz as the victim, the FBI were called upon, as well as an external forensic genealogy laboratory, Othram Detectives were then able to find close relatives and identified Seitz through DNA samples.

Arrest of suspect
Investigators identified the man mentioned by the informant as Martin Motta. He and his brother had owned the barbershop, where Seitz visited when he disappeared, located only a few city blocks from Seitz' home He was arrested, arraigned, and indicted by a grand jury in November 2021.

See also
List of solved missing person cases

References 

1976 in New York City
1970s missing person cases
1976 murders in the United States
December 1976 events in the United States
1970s in Queens
Crimes in Queens, New York
Formerly missing people
Male murder victims
Missing person cases in New York City
People murdered in New York City
Jamaica, Queens